Teletrax is a watermarking and fingerprinting technology company.

History and ownership 
Teletrax was formed as a subsidiary of Medialink Worldwide Incorporated and Philips Electronics with Medialink owning 76% and Philips 24%. It was launched in 2002. On 14 August 2008, it was announced that Philips Content Identification would take full control of Teletrax by purchasing all of Medialink's shares in the business.
On 20 October 2008, the business is known as Philips Content Identification, including Teletrax, announced the completion of its spin-out from Philips Corporate Technologies under the new name of Civolution.

Technology 
Teletrax uses an underlying technology that is patent-protected by both Digimarc and Civolution. Teletrax's technology embeds a digital watermark and fingerprint into video whenever it is edited, transmitted, broadcast or duplicated.

3 domains:

 Radio Monitoring tracks songs on the radio and the internet with accurate and reliable identification of music segments. The information provided allows making detailed reports, listing which station the song was aired on, when the song started, how long it was played, how many times it was played and – if partially played – which segment of the original song was played.
 internet monitoring:  to identify, control and monetize content as it travels around the Internet: track a wide variety of internet sources via ‘massive searches’ (including peer-to-peer file-sharing networks, millions of video-sharing and social media websites, live-streaming websites,  Usenet newsgroups, Chat rooms, forums, and blogs.)
 The aim of Teletrax for Television Monitoring is to automatically verify where, when and how long their content was broadcast via terrestrial, cable or satellite television and generates tracking reports for the content owners. The reported information can be used for contractual compliance, media intelligence, management decisions, client renewals or competitive analysis. Supplemented by Teletrax - OnView, the system makes for the critical perspective of context with the ability to view how and in what manner content is used. The enhanced video streaming and search capabilities allow users to see what  aired as well as saving and emailing clips.

Global operations 
Global operations for Teletrax are managed by 4C Insights with offices in Eindhoven, Netherlands, London, New York City, and Los Angeles. Physical maintenance of the Teletrax network takes place at global co-locations and data and processing centers in Eindhoven, London, and New York. Teletrax currently monitors the broadcast of over 1,700 channels in more than 50 countries globally.

Affiliations 
Teletrax is among the 12 founding members of the Digital Watermarking Alliance, an organization that was formed to promote and educate the public about the benefits of digital watermarking technology.

References 

Broadcasting
Mass media companies of the United Kingdom